Ichneutica stulta is a moth of the family Noctuidae. It is endemic to New Zealand. This species has only been collected from West Plains and Tuturau in Southland but, as at 2021, no male species appears to exist in collections. I. stulta can resemble I. acontistis but can be distinguished as I. stulta has a strongly curved forewing edge as well as having a discal spot on the underside of the hindwing. I. stulta is also darker than specimens of I. acontistis obtained in the southern parts of the South Island. I. stulta is also very similar in appearance to I. emmersonorum  but the later species has darker forewings and is more strongly marked on the thorax. The life history of this species is unknown as are the host species of the larvae but the adults have been recorded as being on the wing from October to December.

It is possible that this species is extinct, likely as a result of habitat loss. It has been recommended that a comprehensive survey be undertaken in spring in the wetlands and shrublands surrounding Invercargill in order to attempt to rediscover this moth.

Taxonomy 
This species was first described by Alfred Philpott in 1905 and named Leucania stulta. Philpott states he used both female and male specimens to inform his description of this species and that he figured a male specimen sourced from Robert Gibb's collection. This specimen has since been lost and no male specimen appears to exist in collections. The lectotype female specimen collected at West Plains, Southland is held at the New Zealand Arthropod Collection. In 1988 J. S. Dugdale, in his catalogue of New Zealand Lepidoptera, placed this species within the genus  Tmetolophota. In 2019 Robert Hoare undertook a major review of New Zealand Noctuidae. During this review the genus Ichneutica was greatly expanded and the genus Tmetolophota was subsumed into that genus as a synonym. As a result of this review, this species is now known as Ichneutica stulta.

Description 
 
Philpott described the species as follows:
The adult female has a wingspan of between 33 and 41 mm. I. stulta can resemble I. acontistis but can be distinguished as I. stulta has a strongly curved forewing edge as well as having a discal spot on the underside of the hindwing. I. stulta is also darker than specimens of I. acontistis obtained in the southern parts of the South Island. Another species I. stulta is very similar in appearance to is I. emmersonorum but the later species has darker forewings and is more strongly marked on the thorax.

Distribution 
It is endemic to New Zealand.  This species has only been collected from West Plains and Tuturau in Southland.

Behaviour 
Adults of this species are on the wing from October to December.

Life history and hosts 
The life history of this species is unknown as are the host species of the larvae.

Conservation status 
It is possible that this species is extinct. Although there has been intensive collecting around the Invercargill area in the 1980s this species has yet to be recorded again. This may be the result of habitat loss or changes in plant composition in this part of New Zealand, particularly the reduction in wetlands and shrublands. Hoare recommends a survey of the remaining shrubland and wetland habitats in spring to try to find this moth.

References

Moths described in 1905
Moths of New Zealand
Endemic fauna of New Zealand
Hadeninae
Taxa named by Alfred Philpott
Endemic moths of New Zealand